
Fulton is a surname. Notable people with the surname include:

A 
 Adam Kelso Fulton (1929-1994), Scottish rugby union internationalist
 Alexander Fulton (1805–1885), founder of the Iowa State Agricultural Society
 Alice Fulton (born 1952), poet, author
 Andrew Fulton (disambiguation), several people'
 Angus Fulton (1900–1983), British civil engineer
 Angus Robertson Fulton (1871–1958), Scottish engineer and academic
 Arnold Fulton (born 1931), British entrepreneur and inventor
 Arthur Fulton (sport shooter) (1887–1972), British sport shooter
 Arthur Fulton (engineer) (1853–1889), New Zealand engineer

B 
 Bill Fulton (disambiguation), several people
 Bob Fulton (1947–2021), Australian former rugby league footballer and coach
 Bobby Fulton (born 1960), former American professional wrestler
 Brenda Sue Fulton, American army officer and campaigner
 Brett Fulton, Australian former professional rugby league footballer
 Bruce Fulton, American professor and translator
 Bryce Fulton (born 1935), Scottish footballer

C 
 Calvin L. Fulton (1840–1907), American surveyor and civil engineer 
 Catherine Fulton (1829–1919), New Zealand diarist and social reformer
 Champian Fulton (born 1985), American jazz singer and pianist
 Charles Fulton (disambiguation), several people
 Charlie Fulton, American football player
 Cheryl Ann Fulton, American harpist
 Christina Fulton, American actress
 Craig Fulton (born 1974), South African hockey player

D 
 Dale Fulton, (born 1992), Scottish footballer
 David Fulton (disambiguation), several people
 Davie Fulton (1916–2000), Canadian politician

E 
 Ed Fulton (born 1938), former Canadian politician
 Eileen Fulton (born 1933), American actress
 Elmer L. Fulton (1865–1939), US Representative from Oklahoma

F 
 Fitzhugh L. Fulton (1925–2015), American research pilot
 Forrest Fulton (1846–1826), British judge and politician
 Francis Fulton-Smith (born 1966), German television actor
 Fred Fulton (1891–1973), American heavyweight boxer
 Frederick John Fulton (1862–1938), British-born Canadian lawyer

G 
 George Fulton (disambiguation), several people
 Gina Fulton (born 1971), British figure skater
 Grace Fulton (born 1996), American actress and dancer
 Grant Fulton (born 1973), South African hockey player
 Gregory Fulton, American computer game designer
 Guy Fulton (1892–1974), American architect

H 
 Hamilton Fulton (c. 1780 – 1834), British engineer
 Harry Fulton (1869–1918), British Army officer who served in the New Zealand Military Forces during WWI
 Henry Fulton (1761–1840), Irish-Australian clergyman
 Herbert Fulton (1872–1951), Indian-born English cricketer
 Holly Fulton (born 1977), British fashion designer

I 
 Ira A. Fulton (born 1931), American businessman and philanthropist

J 
 Jack Fulton (1903–1993), American composer and trombonist
 Jackie Fulton (born 1963), retired American professional wrestler
 James Fulton (disambiguation), several people
 Jay Fulton (born 1994), Scottish footballer
 John Fulton (disambiguation), several people
 Judge Fulton (1739–1826), Irish-born Canadian politician, surveyor and justice of the peace
 Julie Fulton (born 1959), American actress
 Julian Fulton, American  songwriter and musician
 June Fulton (bowls), Botswanan lawn bowls player

K 
 Kenneth Fulton (born 1941), American choral conductor
 Kevin Fulton, British intelligence agent
 Kristian Fulton (born 1998), American football player

L 
 Laurie S. Fulton (born 1949), American attorney and diplomat
 Liam Fulton (born 1984), Australian rugby league footballer

M 
 Marcus Fulton (??-1892), Wisconsin politician
 Margaret Fulton (born 1924), Australian journalist and writer
 Marjorie Fulton (1909–1962), American concert violinist and music educator
 Mark Fulton (born 1959), former Scottish footballer
 Mark Fulton (loyalist) (c. 1961 – 2002), Northern Irish loyalist
 Maude Fulton (1881–1950), American actress, playwright and stage director
 Maurice Garland Fulton (1878–1955), American historian

N 
 Nial Fulton, Irish-born Australian film and television producer

O 
 Oscar Fulton (1843–1907), Canadian merchant and politician
 Otho Fulton (1868–1938),  American inventor

P 
 Peter Fulton (born 1979), New Zealand cricketer
 Pierce Fulton (1992–2021), American musician

R 
 Richard Fulton (1927–2018), American politician
 Rikki Fulton (1924–2004), Scottish television actor
 Robert Fulton (disambiguation), several people
 Robin Fulton (born 1937), Scottish poet
 Roddy Fulton (born 1951), New Zealand Cricket Director
 Ryan Fulton (born 1996), Scottish football player

S 
 Sandy Fulton (1942–2001), Northern Irish footballer
 Sarah Bradlee Fulton (1740–1835), American participant of the Revolutionary War
 Sawyer Fulton (born 1990), American professional wrestler
 Scott Fulton (born 1973), Australian former professional rugby league footballer
 Stephen Fulton (politician) (1810–1870), Canadian merchant shipbuilder and politician
 Steve Fulton (born 1970), former Scottish footballer
 Stokeley Fulton (1929–1985),  American college sports coach

T 
 Thomas Fulton (1949–1994), American conductor
 Thomas Fulton (ironmaster) (1826–1898) Scottish and Australian iron founder
 Tony Fulton (disambiguation), several people
 Travis Fulton (1977–2021), American mixed martial arts fighter

W 
 Wendy Fulton (born 1954), former American television actress
 Weston Fulton (1871–1946), American meteorologist and inventor
 William Fulton (disambiguation), several people

X 
 Xavier Fulton (born 1986), American footballer

Z 
 Zach Fulton (born 1991), American footballer

See also 
 Fulton (disambiguation)